Walker Township may refer to:

In Canada
 Walker Township, Cochrane District, Ontario

In the United States

Arkansas
 Walker Township, Faulkner County, Arkansas
 Walker Township, Franklin County, Arkansas
 Walker Township, White County, Arkansas

Illinois
 Walker Township, Hancock County, Illinois

Indiana
 Walker Township, Jasper County, Indiana
 Walker Township, Rush County, Indiana

Kansas
 Walker Township, Anderson County, Kansas

Michigan
 Walker Township, Michigan

Missouri
 Walker Township, Henry County, Missouri
 Walker Township, Moniteau County, Missouri
 Walker Township, Vernon County, Missouri

Nebraska
 Walker Township, Platte County, Nebraska

North Dakota
 Walker Township, Hettinger County, North Dakota, in Hettinger County, North Dakota

Oklahoma
 Walker Township, Garvin County, Oklahoma

Pennsylvania
 Walker Township, Centre County, Pennsylvania
 Walker Township, Huntingdon County, Pennsylvania
 Walker Township, Juniata County, Pennsylvania
 Walker Township, Schuylkill County, Pennsylvania

See also
Walker (disambiguation)

Township name disambiguation pages